Cecil Harold Vaughan Garton (1 December 1874 – 27 February 1908) was an Australian rules footballer who played one game with Essendon in the Victorian Football League (VFL).

Notes

External links 

1874 births
1908 deaths
Australian rules footballers from Victoria (Australia)
Essendon Football Club players
Benalla Football Club players